Cap de Formentor is the northernmost point of Majorca, on the Formentor peninsula.

Location
Cap de Formentor is located on the northernmost point of the Balearic Island Majorca in Spain. Its highest point, Fumart, is  384m above sea level. It has many associated bays, including Cala Figuera, Cala Murta and Cala Pi de la Posada. 

The Majorcans also call the cape the Meeting point of the winds.

History
In 1863 the Formentor Lighthouse was opened, the remote and rugged location on the Cap de Formentor making construction difficult. The only access being from the sea or via a long mule track.

When the renowned Majorcan poet Miquel Costa i Llobera, who owned the Cap de Formentor peninsula, died, it was divided into lots and sold. In 1928 Adan Diehl, an Argentinian native and art lover, decided to build the Hotel Formentor.

The 13.5 km road which runs from Port de Pollença to Cap de Formentor was built by the Italian engineer Antonio Parietti in 1925. He also constructed the snake road to Sa Calobra. As usual for mountain roads, when the slope is too steep, the road has to go oblique and switch direction when needed.

Attractions
The headland has a number of lookout and viewing points, including Mirador del Mal Pas, also named Mirador d'es Colomer after the small island Colomer. The panorama from Majorca's Finisterre illuminates Menorca in the east, Cala Figuera in the west, and Alcudia with its sandy beach in the south. However, the view of the cliffs below is not for sufferers of vertigo as sea roars 300m below and the winds on the headland can be vicious.

In the southeastern part by Racó de Xot there is a cave with an opening into the sea. It has two entrances located about 8 meters over the surface of the water. The cave has a length of 90 meters and a height of 8 meters and is one of the most important sources of information for the prehistoric talaiot culture.

See also
 The Pine of Formentor
 Prix Formentor
 Formentor Lighthouse

References

Landforms of Mallorca
Pollença
Articles containing video clips
Formentor